Ye with breve (Ӗ ӗ; italics: Ӗ ӗ) is a letter of the Cyrillic script. In Unicode, this letter is called "Ie with breve".

Ye with breve is used in the Chuvash language to represent the close-mid central unrounded vowel .

Computing codes

See also
Е е : Cyrillic Ye

References

Cyrillic letters with diacritics
Letters with breve